Shane Woewodin (born 12 July 1976) is a retired Australian rules football player who played 200 games with the Melbourne and Collingwood Football Clubs. He was the recipient of the Brownlow Medal in 2000. He formerly served as the Offensive Skills coach of the Brisbane Lions, and also as the head coach of the Lions' NEAFL reserves team.

Early career
Born to Ukrainian parents, Woewodin played the majority of his junior career at the Lynwood Ferndale Junior Football Club predominantly as a centre half-forward. LFJFC was a part of the East Fremantle recruiting zone. Shane attended Kent Street Senior High School as a teenager was made his debut for the seniors of East Fremantle in the West Australian Football League (WAFL) in 1995. In 1997, he was picked up by Melbourne in the pre-season draft.

AFL career

Melbourne 
He had a fine start to his career, playing more than 100 consecutive games from his debut.

The highlight of Woewodin's career remains his 2000 Brownlow Medal victory, in which he finished ahead of favourite Scott West of the Western Bulldogs in the votes. Woewodin also played in the losing Grand Final team against Essendon that year.

The 2001 season saw Woewodin suffer the infamous "Brownlow Blues", struggling through injury and poor form as the Demons slid outside the final eight.

Collingwood 
In the aftermath of the 2002 season, in which Woewodin improved on his 2001 but was still unable to recapture his 2000 Brownlow-winning form, Melbourne sought to trade Woewodin to Collingwood as they felt he was underperforming given that he became one of the highest-paid AFL footballers at the end of the 2000 season. Woewodin held general discussions with Collingwood initially, but the media speculated that he was keen to remain at Melbourne and ultimately would accept a reduced salary. However, Woewodin was traded to Collingwood for a first-round draft pick (which Melbourne used on South Australian half-back/midfielder Daniel Bell).

In the days and weeks following his trade, it was revealed that Melbourne approached Woewodin at the end of the season with the view of negotiating a salary reduction. It was rumoured that Woewodin offered to reduce his $500,000 per year contract by approximately $50,000 per year. However, Melbourne officials publicly stated that, specific figures aside, it was clear that Woewodin would never agree to the (substantial) reduction they had in mind. Accordingly, they entered into confidential negotiations with Collingwood. As part of the trade, it was believed that Melbourne would pay approximately $320,000 of Woewodin's salary in his first year at Collingwood and Collingwood would pay the balance of $180,000. In the second year, Melbourne and Collingwood were to pay his salary in equal shares and in his third year, Collingwood would shoulder most of his salary, thereby creating room in Melbourne's salary cap.

Woewodin was informed of his trade to Collingwood while holidaying in Mauritius. Woewodin was understandably shattered to have been moved on without any significant warning. A verbal war of words between Woewodin and Melbourne coach Neale Daniher, in particular, continued until the Melbourne–Collingwood Queen's Birthday match of 2003. After publicly stating he hoped the Magpies would "smash" his old side, Woewodin got his "revenge", picking up 22 touches in the Pies' 52-point victory. It was the only time Collingwood defeated Melbourne during his three-year stint at the club.

Woewodin's finest hour for Collingwood came in the round seven victory over Adelaide at AAMI Stadium, a night best remembered for Chris Tarrant's goal after the siren to clinch victory. Woewodin's hard running across the ground ensured that his 25 possessions and two goals earned him three of his 12 Brownlow votes for the season. From there Woewodin enjoyed a steady first season at Collingwood, as the Pies continued on from their stellar 2002 form to once again meet the Brisbane Lions in the Grand Final. Despite kicking Collingwood's first goal of the match, Woewodin was quiet on the day – as were a number of his teammates – and the Lions ran out convincing 50-point winners. Prior to this game, he had stated to the press that he thought Neale Daniher getting rid of him was a blessing in disguise and that he was happy that he was going to play in a premiership this time, rather than a grand final.

As Collingwood slid from contention in 2004 Woewodin enjoyed his best season in black and white, finishing second in the Copeland Trophy; however, the following season saw Woewodin fall out of favour. With Collingwood winning a mere five games, the club's selection committee opted to pursue a youth policy, which saw the likes of Woewodin, whose lack of leg speed saw him unable to dominate the midfield as he once had, Andrew Williams and, to a lesser extent, Matthew Lokan, ushered out of the side. He was dropped to the club's VFL-affiliate Williamstown on a number of occasions, and at the end of the season, was delisted.

Post-AFL career
Woewodin hoped to be picked up in the pre-season draft to extend his career beyond 2006 (he expressed interest in re-joining Melbourne), but was eventually overlooked by all clubs in the draft. He gave a candid interview on SEN 1116 revealing his disbelief and frustration at not being picked up when, realistically, he could have played for another three or four seasons. Eventually, he could only manage to play for two seasons in the lower-ranked WAFL.

On the Queen's Birthday match between Melbourne and Collingwood on 12 June 2006, Shane Woewodin did a pre-match lap of honour in an open-top car with his children to celebrate his distinguished career with both sides. He tipped Melbourne to win and he was right.  In an interview he gave prior to the game, he continued to signal his intent to return to the AFL in 2007 and was doing "all the right things" with East Fremantle in an attempt to catch the eye of recruiting staff. Woewodin added that he did not have a manager at this point in time, but was hopeful of selection if he simply nominated himself for the draft. However, he was again overlooked by the draft, due to his age (31).

It was rumoured that Woewodin was asked to play in the annual E. J. Whitten Legends Game with all the other past players, but refused – apparently because he felt that it would completely ruin his chances of being drafted in 2007. This is despite the fact that Paul Salmon made a comeback to the AFL after playing in the Legends Game in the year following his first retirement.

East Fremantle 
Woewodin finished his career playing for East Fremantle in the WAFL, his original club. In May 2006, after a 37-possession performance for Western Australia against South Australia, Woewodin again reiterated his desire to return to AFL level. Again he was not selected. He retired at the end of the 2007 WAFL season.

He was named coach of East Fremantle for 2008.

Brisbane Lions 

In October 2010, Woewodin announced that he had signed a two-year deal as the midfield coach for AFL club Brisbane Lions.

Personal life
Woewodin married Deanne Price in 2003. They have four children – Shaye (Deanne's son from a previous relationship), Taj, Sienna and Summer. On 25 November 2021 his son Taj was drafted by Melbourne (pick 65) under the father-son rule.

Playing statistics

|- style="background-color: #EAEAEA"
! scope="row" style="text-align:center" | 1997
|style="text-align:center;"|
| 22 || 22 || 4 || 4 || 169 || 79 || 248 || 74 || 22 || 0.2 || 0.2 || 7.7 || 3.6 || 11.3 || 3.4 || 1.0
|-
! scope="row" style="text-align:center" | 1998
|style="text-align:center;"|
| 22 || 25 || 10 || 10 || 316 || 136 || 452 || 127 || 33 || 0.4 || 0.4 || 12.6 || 5.4 || 18.1 || 5.1 || 1.3
|- style="background:#eaeaea;"
! scope="row" style="text-align:center" | 1999
|style="text-align:center;"|
| 22 || 22 || 10 || 7 || 256 || 104 || 360 || 91 || 20 || 0.5 || 0.3 || 11.6 || 4.7 || 16.4 || 4.1 || 0.9
|-
! scope="row" style="text-align:center" | 2000
|style="text-align:center;"|
| 22 || 25 || 20 || 16 || 367 || 187 || 554 || 107 || 64 || 0.8 || 0.6 || 14.7 || 7.5 || 22.2 || 4.3 || 2.6
|- style="background:#eaeaea;"
! scope="row" style="text-align:center" | 2001
|style="text-align:center;"|
| 22 || 20 || 7 || 8 || 215 || 98 || 313 || 61 || 33 || 0.4 || 0.4 || 10.8 || 4.9 || 15.7 || 3.1 || 1.7
|-
! scope="row" style="text-align:center" | 2002
|style="text-align:center;"|
| 22 || 24 || 12 || 9 || 296 || 170 || 466 || 98|| 73 || 0.5 || 0.4 || 12.3 || 7.1 || 19.4 || 4.1 || 3.0
|- style="background:#eaeaea;"
! scope="row" style="text-align:center" | 2003
|style="text-align:center;"|
| 2 || 25 || 16 || 12 || 322 || 152 || 474 || 115 || 66 || 0.6 || 0.5 || 12.9 || 6.1 || 19.0 || 4.6 || 2.6
|-
! scope="row" style="text-align:center" | 2004
|style="text-align:center;"|
| 2 || 22 || 10 || 12 || 314 || 120 || 434 || 96 || 64 || 0.5 || 0.5 || 14.3 || 5.5 || 19.7 || 4.4 || 2.9
|-style="background:#eaeaea;"
! scope="row" style="text-align:center" | 2005
|style="text-align:center;"|
| 2 || 15 || 5 || 7 || 169 || 73 || 242 || 63 || 31 || 0.3 || 0.5 || 11.3 || 4.9 || 16.1 || 4.2 || 2.1
|- class="sortbottom"
! colspan=3| Career
! 200
! 94
! 85
! 2424
! 1119
! 3543
! 832
! 406
! 0.4
! 0.4
! 12.1
! 5.6
! 17.7
! 4.2
! 2.0
|}

Honours and achievements

Individual
Brownlow Medal: 2000
Keith 'Bluey' Truscott Medal: 2000
Australian Representative Honours in International Rules Football: 2000
AFL Rising Star Nominee: 1997 (Round 10)

References

External links
East Fremantle Football Club player profile for Shane Woewodin

Brownlow Medal winners
1976 births
Living people
Australian people of Ukrainian descent
Melbourne Football Club players
Collingwood Football Club players
East Fremantle Football Club players
Keith 'Bluey' Truscott Trophy winners
East Fremantle Football Club coaches
People educated at Kent Street Senior High School
Australian rules footballers from Perth, Western Australia
Western Australian State of Origin players
Australia international rules football team players